The Tasmanian Southern Ranges is an interim Australian bioregion located in the southern region of Tasmania, comprising .

See also

 Ecoregions in Australia
 Interim Biogeographic Regionalisation for Australia
 Regions of Tasmania

References

Further reading
 

Southern Ranges
IBRA regions
Southern Tasmania
South West Tasmania